A native cloud application (NCA) is a type of computer software that natively utilizes services and infrastructure from cloud computing providers such as Amazon EC2, Force.com, or Microsoft Azure. NCAs exhibit a combined usage of the three fundamental technologies:
 Computational grid - loosely, e.g. MapReduce
 Data grids (e.g. distributed in-memory data caches)
 Auto-scaling on any managed infrastructure

References

Further reading 

 Morris, Kief (2020). Infrastructure as Code: Dynamic Systems for the Cloud Age Second Edition. O'Reilly Media. ISBN 9781098114626, 1098114620.

Grid computing
Cloud computing
Cache (computing)